The Bishop Falls is located in Shillong, in the Indian state of Meghalaya. It is the 22nd highest waterfalls in India.

The falls
The Bishop' Falls is often referred to as the twin brother of the Beadon Falls since both tumble down the same escarpment into a yawning gorge. Beadon Falls and Bishop Falls are off the NH 40 at Mawprem. A narrow road at Mawlai takes one to a view point from where both the falls can be seen together.

See also
List of waterfalls in India
List of waterfalls in India by height

References 

Waterfalls of Meghalaya